Cyperus boreochrysocephalus is a species of sedge that is endemic to an area in South Sudan, Uganda, Kenya and Tanzania.

The species was first formally described by the botanist Kåre Arnstein Lye in 1983.

See also
 List of Cyperus species

References

boreochrysocephalus
Flora of South Sudan
Flora of Uganda
Flora of Tanzania
Flora of Kenya
Plants described in 1983
Taxa named by Kåre Arnstein Lye